The Colegio de San Juan de Letran, (transl: College of San Juan de Letran) also referred to by its acronym CSJL, is a private  Catholic coeducational basic and higher education institution owned and run by the friars of the Order of Preachers in Intramuros, Manila, Philippines. It was founded in 1620. Colegio de San Juan de Letran has the distinction of being the oldest college in the Philippines and the oldest secondary institution in Asia. The school has produced Philippine presidents, revolutionary heroes, poets, legislators, members of the clergy, jurists, and it is also one of the only Philippine schools that has produced several Catholic saints who lived and studied on its campus. The school's patron saint is St. John the Baptist. The campus contains two statues, representing the two foremost alumni in the fields of secular and religious service: former Philippine President Manuel L. Quezon and Vietnamese Saint Vicente Liem de la Paz.

Letran has programs in Business, Management, Marketing, Entrepreneurship, Information Technology, Digital Arts, Communication Arts, Accountancy, Engineering. The colleges are divided into six departments: College of Liberal Arts and Sciences (CLAS), College of Business Administration and Accountancy (CBAA), College of Education (CoEd), Institute of Communication (iCOMM), Institute of Information Technology (iIT), College of Engineering (CoE).

The Colegio has successful athletic programs, particularly in basketball, football (soccer), volleyball, taekwondo, and tennis. Through the years Letran has produced numerous athletes that have donned the national colors (especially in basketball) in international events like the Olympics, Asian Games, Southeast Asian Games, Jones Cup, and FIBA World Championship. Letran is a long-time member of the National Collegiate Athletic Association.

The Colegio was given Level III accreditation by the Philippine Accrediting Association of Schools, Colleges and Universities in the Basic Education department, College of Liberal Arts and Sciences (CLAS), and College of Business Administration and Accountancy (CBAA).

Letran remains in its original campus in Intramuros, Manila, and is a member of the Intramuros Consortium.

History

Beginnings

The name San Juan de Letran is derived from the Basilica of St. John Lateran in Rome, considered as the Mother Church of Christendom. Early in the history of Letran, its chapel was granted many of the privileges enjoyed by the major basilica. Saint John the Baptist, for whom the basilica is named, is the patron saint of Letran.

The college was founded by Don Juan Geromino Guerrero in 1620, a retired Spanish officer and one of the Knights of Malta, in Intramuros as Colegio de Niños Huerfanos de San Juan de Letran.  The school was intended to educate and mold orphans to be good Christian citizens.

Around the month of May in 1632, Fray Diego de Santa Maria, O.P. arrived at the Sto. Domingo convent from Spain via Mexico. He was officially assigned to this same convent on April 23, 1633, and was given the task of conventual porter. He founded the Colegio de Huerfanos de San Pedro y San Pablo. As Don Guerrero grew old, the two schools were fused together, and in 1630, it simply became known as Colegio de San Juan de Letran.

18th century
In 1738, under the reign of King Philip V of Spain opened the Colegio de San Juan de Letran and University of Santo Tomas, and six scholarships were granted by the king for Chinese, Japanese, and Tonkinese students. Vicente Liem de la Paz, Letran's foremost alumnus, was among the students who enjoyed this scholarship taking up trivium and quadrivium along with four Tonkinese namely: Jose de Santo Tomas, Juan de Santo Domingo, Pedro Martir and Pedro de San Jacinto.

19th century
In May 1865, Letran was graded as a College of the First Class by royal decree ordered by Queen Isabella II and, as a result, the school population rose considerably.

In 1886, rector Fr. Bernardino Nozaleda re-organized the school's curriculum into the Lower, Middle, and Superior grades (Infima, Media y Superior) to conform to modern European and American teaching patterns.

20th century
Further expansion took place in 1894 and adjustments were made with the arrival of the Americans in 1900.

After celebrating its tricentennial, Letran was headed by the Rev. Fr. Martin Guillet O.P., who was tasked with replacing Letran's old infrastructure and constructing a new and modern building.

The new facilities were inaugurated and blessed by Rev. Fr. Martin Guillet O.P.. The new St. John the Baptist Building became the Colegio's main building and facade. These events were followed by the construction of the Elementary, High School and College buildings replacing the old structures respectively. The buildings were named after the Dominican founder and saints.

World War II
The growth of the Colegio was temporarily halted when the building was bombed in 1941 and turned into a garrison by the Japanese army in 1944. The Colegio was temporarily housed in the Dominican church and convent of San Juan del Monte. In school year 1942, classes were temporarily transferred to the Dominican Sanctuario of San Juan del Monte. After the war, Letran returned to its home in Intramuros and resumed operations in 1946. Several new construction projects were inaugurated to replace the old structures wrecked by the war.

First Filipino rector
The first Filipino rector and president of the Colegio de San Juan de Letran was Fr. Isidro Katigbak O.P., who served for four straight years. Letran has served by the majority of Spanish rectors and presidents for over 400 years.

Recent history
The school began accepting female students in its college department in the 1970s while the basic education department started accepting first-year female enrollees in June 2005.

In April 2007, Fr. Tamerlane Lana O.P. was elected rector and president of Letran, of the Intramuros and Abucay campuses, by the Board of Trustees to serve a four-year term until April 2011. Fr. Lana became the 80th rector of the Manila campus. Fr. Lana's administration has undertaken the task of changing and upgrading the Colegio's academic standards to meet those required to attain university status. This work also includes the revision of the vision and mission, research development, community service, and the 12-year strategic plan for 2008 until 2020.

Starting academic year 2007–08, Letran became a "wi-fi zone" to cater its students access to the internet.

In October 2007, two former Letran administrators were among the 498 Spanish martyrs beatified by Pope Benedict XVI. They are Fr. Jesus Villaverde Andres, OP, a former rector; and Fr. Antonio Varona Ortega, OP, a former professor and moderator of the NCAA Philippines.

On July 3, 2008, Fr. Lana formally launched the Letran Center for Intramuros Studies (LCIS). The initiative to establish the center sprang from the 12-year development plan as the school hopes to become a leader in cultural and historical studies, particularly on the subject of Intramuros. The day also marked the 435th anniversary of the signing of the royal decree by King Philip II in San Lorenzo, Spain on July 3, 1573, that prescribed the foundation of Hispanic colonial towns, which served as basis for the systematic layout for the establishment of Intramuros, which was known then as Spanish Manila.

In June 2015, Fr. Clarence Victor C. Marquez, O.P. was elected 81st Rector and President of Letran Manila and Bataan.

Campus

St. John The Baptist Building

Also known as the Administration Building, it houses the office of the rector and president. It houses the Admission Office, Financial Affairs Office, The Letran Center for Intramuros Studies Office (LCIS), Guidance Counselor Office, the Information Technology Center, College of Business Administration and Accountancy, College of Education, and the Institute of Information Technology. The bookstore, lobby, and chapel are also in this building. The St. John Lateran convent of the Letran Dominican Fathers is located here.

Our Lady of Aranzazu Building
The former St. Antoninus Building is dedicated in honor of Our Lady of Aranzazu, where the Arch-confraternity of Nuestra Senora de Aranzazu was solemnly established in Letran on December 16, 1772, by virtue of a pontifical brief issued by Benedict XIV on September 18, 1748. It holds the promenade and Salon de Actos (student lounge).

St. Dominic de Guzman Building
The building who was named after the founder of the Order of Preachers (Dominicans). This building houses classrooms, Science and Psychology Laboratory, College of Liberal Arts and Sciences and The Institute of Communication.

St. Thomas Aquinas Building

This building houses the Library and Media Center for Communication Arts students. The Media Center has two sections: Instructional Media and Broadcast Media. It provides human and material resources for instructional and broadcast purposes.  Among the facilities are an audio-video library, viewing rooms, instructional media resources for circulation. Services include lending of instructional materials, rendering the execution of art work, photo coverage and black-and-white photo developing and printing. For broadcast media facilities, the TV production studio, radio production and studio post-production. Services offered are audio and video production and editing, video coverage, etc. Several facilities are the Apple Mac-Lab Editing Suite, TV Studio, Radio Mini Station and many more. The library is divided into sections:

Filipiniana Section
Circulation Section
High School Library
Graduate School Library
Media Library
Internet Section
Periodical Section
Archives Section

The St. Thomas Building has a television for televiewing purposes.

St. Raymond of Peñafort Building
The former High School Building, St. Raymond of Peñafort houses the Office of the Vice Rector for Religious Affairs. It includes the Accounting Stock Room, Lost and Found Office, Hospitality Management Facility, Auxiliary Services, Audit Services, Letran Alumni Association Office, and the Center for Community Development Office. The school clinic is in this building.

St. Albert the Great Building
This building is also known as the Student Center Building because it houses student facilities such as the canteens, a modern 400-seat auditorium, Office of the Student Affairs, Letran Student Council Office, the Graduate School faculty room and student lounge,  six SC classrooms, Thesis Section, The Lance Publication Office, and the Office of the Dean in Graduate School.

St. Vincent Ferrer Building
This building serves the basic education department, the College of Engineering, and it also houses the music room and speech laboratory.

St. John Paul Solamo Building

It serves as the headquarters of maintenance and housekeeping of the Colegio.

Blessed Antonio Varona Gymnasium
It is the home of the Knights and Squires, Letran's collegiate and high school varsity teams that play in the NCAA and other sports tournaments, located right across the Student Center Building along Beaterio Street in Intramuros. Letran Gym has three physical education classrooms with a centralized air-conditioned unit. It houses the Letran Hall of Fame and the P.E. faculty. The Letran Gym is named in honor of Blessed Antonio Varona, OP, former Letran Professor and Athletics Moderator.

The old gym was demolished in April 2019 and will be replaced by the Quadricentennial Building, a multi-purpose sports facility.

San Vicente Liem dela Paz Dormitory
The dormitory of Letran Manila located beside the Letran Gym.

Academics

College of Business Administration and Accountancy
The College of Business Administration and Accountancy offers a wide range of business courses especially in management. Letran's CBAA was known as the flagship college of the institution. The college produced many alumni and students who excelled in the field of business: one of these is the prominent Filipino businessman Enrique Zobel de Ayala — the first patriarch of the Zobel de Ayala family.

College of Liberal Arts and Sciences
Same as the CBAA, College of Liberal Arts and Sciences or CLAS is the flagship college offering courses in the Colegio. Its Liberal Studies program offers required subjects in the Humanities, Social Sciences, Natural Sciences, Mathematics, Languages and Health, and Physical Education. It also offers majors in Communication Arts, Psychology, Political Science, AB Advertising, AB Public Relation, AB Journalism, and AB Broadcasting. It likewise offers subjects required in all courses such as Seminar Workshop and Practicum (SWP), Research Methods and Practicum (RMP) where students are required to undertake " on the job training" and come up with a research paper (thesis). Community Service is given a central place in all courses. The CLAS also offers as part of its core curriculum subjects such as theology and other supplemental activities like parish exposure, retreats and recollection, community outreach program to our adopted communities.

CLAS was accredited by the PAASCU in May 2005.

The CLAS also has programs that focus not only improving research in the Colegio, such as evaluation of the panel members, thesis advisers and even the defense proceedings to ensure quality research outputs by our students. The best theses awards program will be implemented this school year.

Foreign languages as electives such as Mandarin, French, Spanish and Japanese are also offered in the CLAS.

Members of the college's staff have been required to have master's degrees and are required to continuously improve themselves academically and professionally by attending seminars, workshops, conferences etc. and to participate in spiritual, social and cultural activities in and out of the Colegio. The annual Echo Seminar organized by the CLAS is an opportunity for all faculty who had attended various activities outside to share their experiences and insights and give impetus to stimulating academic interactions among the faculty. Likewise, the faculty of each area are required to come up with an action research output presented in a colloquium spearheaded by the RPOD. Moreover, the faculty and staff had been encouraged to use Technology as an educational tool in research; to facilitate effectiveness and efficiency in office operation and Instruction.

Institute of Communication
The Institute of Communication, called iComm, offers programs, several of which are considered as the flagship courses of the Colegio.  For 10 consecutive years, students of the Institute of Communication brought home awards from the Catholic Mass Media Awards and Metro Manila Film Festival for student categories.  Letran iComm students also won the prominent Student Academy Awards, the IBDA'A Awards. The institute was also awarded as 'School of the year' by the Philippine Quill Awards.  And also, IComm has been producing multi-talented students that excels inside the Colegio.

College of Education
The College of Education began as an area in the College of the Liberal Arts, Sciences, and Education in 2002 with an initial enrollment of seventeen students and six teachers in its Bachelor of Science in Secondary Education program. In 2006, the education area separated to become an independent college.

College of Engineering and Information Technology
The Colegio started to offer engineering programs in 2012. With the transfer of the Institute of Information Technology, Letran established its youngest college, the College of Engineering and Information Technology (CEIT). The CEIT currently offers four engineering programs and three specialization on the information technology program.

Institute of Information Technology
In 2003, Letran Manila was the first school to partner with Microsoft for the Microsoft IT Academy program in the Philippines. It is one of the academic institutions that offers a degree in Information Technology mapped with the premier certification from Microsoft. It began as an area in the College of the Liberal Arts, Sciences, and Education. Starting A.Y. 2012–13, the Institute of Information Technology transferred to the College of Engineering.

Graduate school
The Professional School for Continuing Education in Business of the Letran Graduate School is located at the St. Albert the Great building.

Basic Education
The Colegio de San Juan de Letran in Manila has a Basic Education department that has been in existence for almost 400 years. Letran started as an all-boys school, then began accepting female enrollees in the first year during the academic year 2005–06 for its basic education program.

The Elementary Level caters a two-year start from pre-school and six years of elementary, Now forming part of the Basic Education Department of the Colegio, the elementary level starts from the first two years of pre-school – Kindergarten and Preparatory – and six years of elementary education. The pupils in this Department are called Pages, the name given to those who are in the first stage of knighthood. Here, pupils are taught the basic rudiments not only of reading, writing, and arithmetic but also of other areas, which include character formation.The Elementary Department of Letran Manila is located at the St. Vincent Ferrer building.

The High School Department is located in the St. Raymond of Penafort building.

Athletics

Letran is a member of the National Collegiate Athletic Association from 1928 to 1932, and since 1936.

The Colegio currently participates in basketball, volleyball, football (soccer), track and field, taekwondo, Lawn Tennis, and table tennis. The varsity teams are called Letran Knights (for seniors division), Squires (for juniors division) and Lady Knights (for women's division)

The seniors basketball team is the second most successful team in the NCAA. Since joining in the 1928–29 season, the Knights have won a total of seventeen titles. The most recent championship came in the 2019–2020 tournament.

Their most prominent rivals are the De La Salle Green Archers  (before the Green Archers left the NCAA), San Beda Red Lions, San Sebastian Stags and the Mapua Cardinals, their neighbor in Intramuros.

Other Campuses

Colegio de San Juan de Letran – Abucay, Bataan

Rev. Fr. Rogelio Alarcon, O.P., former rector and president of Colegio de San Juan de Letran in Intramuros, Manila, and an alumnus proposed the idea of having another campus in the north. The province of Bataan was chosen. Initially, two sites in Bataan were presented: Hermosa and Balanga. After three years in the conceptualization stage, a third site, Abucay, was also considered. By what could be described as heavenly intercession and providential twists, Abucay was selected. The community of St. John Lateran, the Board of Colegio de San Juan de Letran and the Council of the Philippine Dominican Province approved the establishment of Letran-Abucay in 1998.

Construction started in 2000 in the fifteen-hectare area, donated by Mayor and Mrs. Liberato Santiago, Mr. and Mrs. Nicanor Soriano, and Gov. and Mrs. Leonardo Roman. Views of the Manila Bay and the surrounding mountains, including Mt. Samat, envelope the site. One of the main attractions of Letran-Abucay is its relatively undisturbed natural area and environment.

Preparations for the establishment of the Letran-Abucay campus spanned over the terms of three Filipino Dominican provincials: Rev. Fr. Quirico Pedregosa, O.P., Rev. Fr. Ernesto Arceo, O.P. and Rev. Fr. Edmund Nantes, O.P., an alumnus. Rev. Fr. Edwin Lao, O.P., former rector and president of Letran-Intramuros spearheaded the over-all construction of the building and the formulation of the guiding principles of the institution. The blessing and inauguration on June 4, 2006, coincided with the gathering of the priors and superiors of the Philippine Dominican Province. Bishop Socrates Villegas, D.D., also an alumnus, officiated the Eucharistic celebration and blessing.

Letran Bataan produced its first batch of graduates in March 2010. Letran Bataan Science High School will open in June 2011.

Colegio de San Juan de Letran – Calamba, Laguna

When the government declared its policy of decongesting Metro Manila, the Dominican Province of the Philippines instituted long-term plans which included the establishment of an extension school in Laguna. This plan was prepared by the Commission for the Planning of the Ministry of the Word.

An 11-hectare tract of land along the foothills of the legendary Mount Makiling in Bucal, Calamba, Laguna, was chosen as the site.

The school was founded on March 11, 1979. Rev. Fr. Ramon Salinas, OP was the project director; Rev. Fr. Jesse Lorete, OP served as the Coordinator of Student/Personnel Services; and Mr. Jose Marcelino, Principal of the Elementary Department of Letran-Intramuros, was the academic provost. Being an extension campus, Letran-Calamba was placed under the supervision of Rev. Fr. Regino Cortez, OP, the rector of Letran-Intramuros.

On August 7, 1986, Letran-Calamba finally gained its autonomy from Letran-Intramuros with the installation of Rev. Fr. Tamerlane Lana, OP, as its first president and rector. 

With the school buildings still under construction, the first semester of its first school year saw Letran's pioneer instructors (most of whom commuted from Letran-Manila) and students holding classes at the rented half-finished building of Laguna Poly medic Center, Inc. now known as the PAMANA.

To smoothen the school operations, Rev. Fr. Patricio Apa, O.P. was designated the First Director of Letran-Calamba in 1980. Assisting him as the Academic Provost was Mr. Constante Molina.

The year 1981 saw the blessing of the four-story main Building, the three-story engineering/Elementary/ High School Building, and the Shop. Various offices and services were expanded to ensure the implementation of the development plan and programs. The college departments had their first academic heads; Engr. Dominador Chua for Engineering and Commerce, and Rev. Fr. Enrico Gonzales, O.P. for Arts & Sciences.

Letran-Calamba graduates took the board examinations both in Mechanical Engineering and Certified Public Accountant licensing exam with several of the Mechanical Engineering board passers landing in the top positions. In 1987–1991, Letran placed 20th (average ranking by the Professional Regulation Commission) in the Overall National Passing Percentage of Mechanical Engineers, ranking second in Region IV in the 1987 ME Board Examination.

In the March 2010 Electronics Engineering examination, 75% of Letran graduates who took the licensure examination passed. The national passing rate was 27%.

Colegio de San Juan de Letran – Manaoag, Pangasinan

The Holy Rosary Academy of Manaoag was founded in 1947 by Fr. Teodulo Cajigal, a Spanish Dominican priest.

In 1990, the Dominican Fathers requested the help of the Dominican sisters in Pangasinan to teach Christian Living subjects in the Holy Rosary Academy of Manaoag. In response, two sisters were assigned in San Manuel for this purpose. In 1992, the Fathers entrusted the management of the school to the sisters.  From then on, the sisters resided in the vicinity of the school. The sisters worked tirelessly to improve the school and in 2001 the school was granted permit to offer collegiate education. The school then operated under the name Our Lady of Manaoag College.

On August 8, 2014, Our Lady of Manaoag College signed a MOA with Letran - Manila, Letran - Calamba, and Letran - Bataan for the integration of the college into the Letran System. A proposal of changing its name to Colegio de San Juan de Letran - Manaoag was unanimously approved by its Board of Trustees on September 6, 2014.

It was on October 3 that Our Lady of Manaoag College was officially relaunched as the Pangasinan campus of the college, and many activities were held in celebration of the formal reopening under the banner of the Letran system. The newest Letran campus is located in Manaoag, within meters from the Dominican-administered municipal church and the town hall.

Gallery

Official publications

The Lance, the official student publication of Colegio de San Juan de Letran – Manila
Esplendente, the official student publication of Letran Senior High School Department
The Letran Scroll for the High School Level
Letran Page for the Elementary Level
Muralla is the literary portfolio of The Lance
Letran News for the Administration
KNIGHTline for Letran Alumni Association
Luz Y Saber – Letran Research Journal
Letranense – Yearbook
The Shield, the official student publication of Colegio de San Juan de Letran – Bataan
The Squires Chronicle, the official student publication of the high school department of Letran – Bataan
"Ang Pahayangang Inggo", the official student publication in Filipino language of the high school department of Letran – Bataan
The Knight, the official publication of the collegiate department of Letran-Calamba
The Squire, the official publication of the high school department of Letran-Calamba
Ang Kabalyero, the official publication, in Filipino language, of the high school department of Letran-Calamba
The Page, the official publication of the elementary department of Letran-Calamba
Barangay Letran, the official publication of the administration and academic schools of Letran-Calamba
Lilok – Letran-Calamba research journal

Notable alumni (Letran Manila)

Saint
 St. Vicente Liem dela Paz, O.P. (HS,1747–1750) – Letran's foremost alumnus and heavenly patron. A young Vietnamese scholar who studied in Letran during the 18th century. Also known as Vicente Pham Hieu Liem, or Vicente Le Quang Liem de Tonkin.
 St. Tomas Hioji Rokuzayemon Nishi de San Jacinto, O.P. – Born in Kyūshū, Japan. Tomas went to the Philippines and studied Theology in University of Santo Tomas. Upon returning to his homeland, he was captured and was martyred through the "gallows and hole" torture.
 St. Pedro de Sta. Maria, O.P.
 St. Vicente Shiwozuka Dela Cruz de Nagasaki, O.P.- Among the martyrs of the persecution of Christians in Japan with San Lorenzo Ruiz de Manila.
 St. Francisco Shoyemon, O.P.
 St. Jacobo Kyushei Gorobioye Tomanaga de Santa Maria, O.P.
 St. Domingo Tuoc, O.P.
 St. Vicente Do Yen, O.P.

Venerable
 Fr. Juan Bautista de Santa Maria Fung, O.P.- Entered Letran on July 8, 1736. Embraced the Dominican Order in 1744 and martyred in July 1755

Blesseds
Beato Fr. Jesus Villaverde Andres, O.P. – Among the 498 martyrs of the Spanish Civil war beatified by Pope Beneditc XVI last October 28, 2007.
Beato Fr. Antonio Varona, O.P.

Presidents of the Philippines
 Emilio Aguinaldo (HS, 1886) (1899–1901)
 Manuel L. Quezon (HS, 1889; AB, 1894) (1935–1944)
 Sergio Osmeña (HS, 1889; AB, 1894) (1944–1946)
 José P. Laurel (HS) (1943–1945)

Vice Presidents of the Philippines
 Mariano Trías (AB) (Tejeros Convention, 1897)
 Fernando Lopez (HS, 1921) (1949–1953, 1965–73)

Chief Justices of the Supreme Court of the Philippines
 Cayetano L. Arellano (HS) (1901–1920)
 Victorino M. Mapa (1920–1921)
 Manuel G. Araullo (Ab Philo) (1921–1924)
 Ramon Q. Avanceña (AB) (1925–1941)
 Andres R. Narvasa (GS'38) (1991–1998)
 Diosdado M. Peralta (BS Economics) (1974)

Heroes of the Philippine Revolution
 Don Pedro Abad Santos (HS) – revolutionary hero; founder of the Socialist Party of the Philippines
 Marcelo H. del Pilar - leader of the Propaganda Movement in Spain; second and last editor of La Solidaridad
 Mariano Abella (AB) – a delegate to the Malolos Congress
 Crispulo Aguinaldo (AB) – a revolutionary leader, older brother of Emilio Aguinaldo
 Santiago Alvarez (AB) – one of the most valiant generals of the Revolution
 Gen. Servillano Aquino – a delegate to the Malolos Congress, revolutionary leader
 Vito Belarmino – major-generals of the revolutionary army
 Higinio Benitez (GS, HS, AB) – a delegate to the Malolos Congress
 Fr. José Burgos (AB, Philo 1855) – GOMBURZA
 Don Graciano Cordero – a delegate to the Malolos Congress
 Mariano Crisostomo (HS, AB) – a delegate to the Malolos Congress
 Gen. Emiliano Riego De Dios – revolutionary leader
 Severino De Las Alas – a revolutionary leader
 Dr. Trinidad Pardo de Tavera – a delegate to the Malolos Congress
 Ladislao Diwa (AB) – a patriot who was among the founders of the Katipunan that initiated the Philippine Revolution against Spain in 1896.
 Gen. Edilberto Evangelista (AB) – Hero of the Battle of Zapote Bridge, revolutionary leader
 Lorenzo Fenoy – a delegate to the Malolos Congress
 Gen. Leandro Locsin Fullon- revolutionary leader, former Provincial Governor of Antique
 Maximo Gregorio – one of the Thirteen Martyrs of Cavite
 Emilio Jacinto (AB) – Revolutionary hero & Brains of the Katipunan
 Apolinario Mabini (AB, 1887) – Political philosopher and revolutionary who wrote the constitution for the first Philippine republic of 1899–1901, and served as its first prime minister in 1899. He is often referred to as "the Sublime Paralytic", and as "the Brains of the Revolution."
 Gen. Mariano Llanera – revolutionary leader
 Honorio Lopez (AB) – revolutionary leader
 Victoriano Luciano – one of the Thirteen Martyrs of Cavite
 Gen. Vicente Lukbán – revolutionary leader and Governor of Tayabas (now Quezon) from 1912 to 1916
 Gen. Mamerto Natividad, Jr. – Lieutenant General of the Philippine Revolutionary Army; Drafted the manifesto decree of Biac-na-Bato in July 1897; Signer of the Constitution of Biac- na-Bato which established the provisional revolutionary government.
 Pablo Ocampo – delegate to the Malolos Congress
 Jose Maria Panganiban y Enverga (1883) – propagandist
 Fr. Pedro Pelaez – Father of Secularization Movement in the Philippines
 Gen. Artemio Ricarte – revolutionary leader
 Antonio San Agustin – one of the Thirteen Martyrs of Cavite
 Pablo Tecson (AB) – revolutionary leader
 Dr. Pío Valenzuela – Chief Aid of Andres Bonifacio
 Aguedo Velarde (AB) – a delegate to the Malolos Congress
 Faustino Villaruel – a mason and one of the founding member of the La Liga Filipina, and supporter of the propaganda movement.
 Flaviano Yenko (AB) – revolutionary leader
 Fr. Jacinto Zamora (AB) – GOMBURZA
 Phil Villas – Isabela Province Freedom fighter
 Gen. Isidro Torres – a revolutionary who established Katipunan chapters in Bulacan. "Matanglawin" of the Katipunan.

Senators of the Philippines

 Francisco Tongio Liongson (Third District, Fourth Philippine Legislature 1916–1919)
 Eulogio Rodriguez, Sr. (AB, 1896) (Senate President, 1952–53, 1953–1963)
Vicente Madrigal 
 Francisco Afan Delgado
 Isabelo delos Reyes (AB)
 Richard Gordon (PR, 1955)
 Pedro Guevara (1896)
Esteban Quimbo Singzon- First senator of the senatorial districts of Samar and Leyte
 Teodoro Kalaw
Nicolas Capistrano,(Senator- 4th Philippine Legislature, 1916–1919)
 Enrique Magalona (AB, 1907)
 Quintin Paredes (House Speaker, 1933–35)
 Freddie Webb (AB English), also many time member of the Philippine basketball team in the 1972 Olympics
 Vicente "Tito" Sotto III (GS,HS,AB English) Senate President, Republic of the Philippines

Congressmen of the Philippines
 Benigno Aquino, Sr. (AB, 1904) (House Speaker, 1943–44)
 Sergio Apostol
 Gus Tambunting (GS,HS,BS) Congressman, Parañaque

Governors
 Leonardo "Ding" Roman (HS) (Bataan 1986–2004)
 Macario Arnedo (Pampanga 1904—1912)
 Francisco Tongio Liongson (Pampanga 1912–1916)
 Francisco Gopez Nepomuceno (GS 1928, HS 1936, BSC 1940) – (Pampanga 1960–1971)
 Honorio Ventura (Pampanga 1916, 1918–1922)
 Luis "Chavit" Singson (BSC, 1961) (Ilocos Sur)
 Jesus Typoco, Jr. (BSC, 1968) (Daet, Camarines Norte) Bicol
 Melecio Y. Severino (HS) – (Negros Oriental, Occidental)
Ramil L. Hernandez (BSC,1993) – Province of Laguna
Mayors
 Albert G. Ambagan, Jr. (AB-Political Science, 1998) – (Amadeo, Cavite)
 Edwin M. Bautista (Strike Revilla) (BSC-Management, 1991; MBA) – (Bacoor)
 Leon G. Guinto, Sr. (College) – Manila, former Secretary of Labor
 Arsenio Cruz Herrera (AB, 1880) – first civilian mayor of Manila
 Justo R. Lukban (AB, 1873) – Mayor of Manila 1917–1920, Congressman – Manila 2nd District – 1909 to 1912
 Mary Jane Ortega (AB-Spanish and English, 1959) – San Fernando, La Union
 Isagani C. Pascual (GS, 1962) – (Guiguinto, Bulacan)
 Alain P. Rabang (HS, 1983) – (Umingan, Pangasinan)
 Enrique B. Yap, Jr. (HS, 1982) – (Sarangani)

Councilors
 Ricardo L. Baes, Jr. – HS 1981; District 1, Parañaque
 Greco Antonio Belgica – HS 1965; District 6, Manila
 Engr. Giovanni Esplana – District 2, Parañaque
 Willand Patrick Florendo – HS 1996; Floridablanca, Pampanga
 Martin Isidro, Jr. – GS 1976, BSC 1985; District 1, Manila
 Valmar "Val" Sotto – HS 1968; District 2, Parañaque
 Darwin B. Icay – AB Political Science, 1997 – Taguig
 Jim Gerald Pe – AB Political Science, 1997 – Coron, Palawan
 Albert Joseph Cruz – GS 1997, HS 2001 – Meycauayan, Bulacan

Other government officials
 Felipe Agoncillo – Ambassador
 Herminio A. Astorga (HS, 1951) – Vice Mayor, Manila, 1964 TOYM Awardee for Political leadership, NCAA Basketball Athlete
 Angelito Banayo (El., HS, College) – Political Consultant, former General Manager of the Philippine Tourism Authority, former Administrator of the National Food Authority
 Jaime C. de Veyra – Historian, Educator, former Director of the Institute of National Language
Legal
 Pedro Tongio Liongson – Judge Advocate General, Army of First Philippine Republic (1899)
 Bernardo P. Pardo (HS, 1950) – former Associate Justice (1998–2002); Former chairman of COMELEC
 Felicismo Feria (AB) – former Associate Justice (1945–1953)
 Carlos Imperial (GS) – former Associate Justice
 Diosdado M. Peralta (BS Commerce, 1974) – Associate Justice, Supreme Court
 Gregorio Perfecto (AB) – former Associate Justice (1945–1949)
 Florentino Torres (Philosophy) – former Associate Justice
 Augusto K. Aligada, Jr. – Civil Law Expert, Former Dean of Faculty of Civil Law in University of Santo Tomas
 Quintin Paredes III – Civil Law Expert, member FROKS (Manila)
 Antonio Paredes, Jr. – legal counsel of Senator Loren Legarda, member FROKS shooting team, member FROKS (Manila)
 Oscar T. Castelo (HS) – Judge of Manila Court (1946), City Attorney of Quezon City 
 Rafael del Pan (HS) – Lawyer, Nationalist, Criminologist and Reformist, Solicitor General of Philippine Islands
 Eugenio H. Villareal (GS 1976, HS 80) – former Chairperson, Movie and Television Review and Classification Board (MTRCB) (Dec 2012 – Jan 2017); Professor of Law in Evidence, Legal Philosophy, and Media & Entertainment Law
 Salvador Medialdea (BSC) – is a Filipino lawyer, business executive and government administrator who is the former Executive Secretary of the Philippines during the administration of former president Rodrigo Duterte
Men of Cloth
 Archbishop Artemio Casas (HS, 1930) – former Rector of Manila Cathedral (1956–1962)
 Archbishop Oscar Cruz, DD (GS, 1950) – Lingayen–Dagupan
 Archbishop Ramon Salazar, OP
 Archbishop Socrates Villegas (HS, 1977), member FROKS (Manila) 
 Bishop Teodoro Bacani (HS, 1956) – Novaliches
 Bishop Jose Salazar, OP (HS, 1958) – Batanes
 Bishop Alfredo Versoza
 Fr. Gregorio Aglipay (AB, 1877–1881) – Co-founder of the Philippine Independent Church
 Fr. Rufino "Jun" Sescon, Jr. (HS, 1988) Chancellor, Arzobispado de Manila; Chaplain, Sto. Nino de Paz Chapel
Writers
 Francisco Alonso Liongson – Filipino Playwright in Spanish
 Francisco Balagtas – Poet and is widely considered as the Tagalog equivalent of William Shakespeare for his impact on Filipino literature. The famous epic, Florante at Laura, is regarded as his defining work.
 Jesús "Batikuling" Balmori – Renowned Filipino Poet in Spanish, Premio Zobel awardee (1926)
 Marcelo H. Del Pilar – Writer & Propagandist; One of the co-publisher and founder of La Solidaridad
 Fernando De La Concepcion – Journalist, Premio Zobel awardee (1960)
 Carlos De La Rosa – Journalist, Premio Zobel awardee (1984)
 Ermin Garcia, Sr. – Journalist, Founder of Pangasinan Newspaper "Sunday Punch"

 Enrique Fernandez Lumba – Spanish Journalist and Poet, Premio Zobel awardee (1954)
 Bienvenido Lumbera (HS, 1950) – National Artist of the Philippines; Recipient of the Ramon Magsaysay Award for Journalism, Literature and Creative communication; Carlos Palanca Memorial Awardee
 Jesus T. Peralta (HS, 1951; AA-PM, 1953) – Writer, essayist and social scientist; Hall of Famer Carlos Palanca Memorial Awards in Literature
 Mariano Ponce (1885) – Writer & Propagandist
 Severino Reyes – Writer, dramatist, and playwright, highly acclaimed as one of the giants of Tagalog literature of the early 20th century. Author of "Walang Sugat" and "Ang mga Kwento ni Lola Basyang."
 Guillermo Gomez Rivera (AB) – Writer, Premio Zobel awardee (1975)
 Rolando Tinio (HS, 1950, AA'52) – National Artist of the Philippines for Theater and Literature

Educators
 Dr. Bonifacio Lopez Mencias – a Filipino physician, epidemiologist, guerrilla sympathizer, and martyr. He is best known for providing aid to the Philippine guerrillas in his capacity as Dean of the UST College of Medicine during the Japanese occupation of the Philippines.
 Mariano V. de los Santos – Founder of the University of Manila
 Bienvenido Gonzalez – former president of the University of the Philippines (UP)
 Dr. Fernan Lukban (HS, 1978) – Head, Business and Economics Program of Arts and Sciences, University of Asia and the Pacific (UA&P)
 Jovencio Ortañez – former president of Ortañez University
 Ignacio Villamor (AB, 1885) – First Filipino president of UP, Associate justice at the Supreme Court
 Kenneth Glenn L. Manuel – CPA Reviewer, 6th place, 2019 Bar Examinations

Sportspeople
 Sambiao Basanung – Olympic Swimmer (1948)
 Enrique Beech – Olympic Shooter (1956, 1960)
 Felicisimo Fajardo – Basketball player and coach. Olympian (1948, 1952)
 Gabriel "Gabby" Fajardo – Basketball player
 Rudy Hines – Naturalized import from New York. Basketball player and PBA official
 Samboy Lim – Basketball player. The "Skywalker" of the PBA and was named as one of PBA's 25 Greatest Players.
 Col. Julian Malonzo – Basketball player and FIBA official. Former President of the Philippine Olympic Committee (POC)
 Willie Miller - PBA Most Valuable Player, Member FIBA Asia Powerade Team Pilipinas
 Lauro "The Fox" Mumar – Played in the 1948 London Olympics; a former Filipino basketball player and later served as the national team head coach of India and the Philippines. He was one of the greatest Filipino players of his time. Member of the famous Letran "Murder Inc." basketball team, 1950 NCAA Champions
 Oliver Opeda Ongtawco- Olympic Bowler and coach; PSA Bowler of the year (1979)
 Carlos Padilla – Olympic Boxer (1932)
 Jose Padilla, Jr.- Olympic Boxer (1932)
 Fausto Preysler – Olympic Yachting (1960, 1964)
 Kerby Raymundo – PBA Player
 Antero "Terry" Saldaña – PBA Player
 Mike Mustre – PBA Player
 Nemie Villegas – Basketball player and coach
 Ricardo Pineda – Member, 1970 NCAA Champion Men's Basketball Team, once held the NCAA record of 52 pts in a game against Ateneo. Played in the PBA for Mariwasa & U-Tex 
 Manuel Pineda – Member, 1970 NCAA Champion Men's Basketball Team. Played in the PBA for San Miguel 
 Ramon San Juan – (El'71,HS'75,College), Member, 1979 NCAA Men's Basketball Champion & 1979 MVP
 Rino Salazar – PBA player and coach
 Angelito Esguerra – (College) Member, 1979 NCAA Men's Basketball Champion
 Joaquin Lopez – Football Hall of Fame
 Bryan Faundo – NCAA Men's Basketball Team Champion '05–'06, ABL, PBA Player 
 Ramil Abratique – Taekwondo Champion, Silver medalist World Championships
 Mark Andaya – former PBA player, former ABL player played for Philippine Patriots; actor
 Boyet Bautista – former PBA player, PBL player Harbour Centre Batang Pier
 RJ Jazul – PBA Player, Smart Gilas Player National Basketball Team
 Rey Guevarra - PBA player, NCAA Slam Dunk Champion, PBA Slam Dunk Champion, Smart Gilas National Basketball Team 
 Raymond Almazan – PBA Player, NCAA MVP, Defensive Player of the year (NCAA)
 Jaypee Belencion – PBA Player
 Louie Alas – PBA Player, Smart Gilas Player National Basketball Team
 Alfrancis Chua -(HS) Letran Basketball Jr. Division, PABL Player, PBA Head Coach and Team Manager
 Michael Garcia – Laguna Lakers MBA Player, Alaska Aces PBA Player
 Paul Guerrero – PBA Draftee Round 3 29th Overall by Purefoods, Davao Eagles MBA Player 
 Anton Villoria – PBA Player Red Bull Thunder
 Jam Cortes – PBA D-League Player
 Caloy Garcia – (HS) PBL Player, PBL, NCAA, PBA Head Coach
 Aldin Ayo – Former Letran Knight Player '98 to '01, Basketball Clinic Director, Councilor of Sorsogon City, Head Coach 2015 NCAA Men's Basketball Team Seniors Division, Asst. Coach KIA Motors Carnival in PBA 
 Erwin Velez – PBA Draftee Mobiline Phone Pals 1st Round 4th Overall
 Al David – PBA Player Presto Ice Cream
 Jason Misolas – PBA Player
 Gilbert Castillo – PBA, MBA Player
 Billy Moody – Naturalized import from Kansas. PBA Player
 Ed Ducut – PBA Player Ginebra San Miguel
 Dong Polistico – PBA Player 
 Genesis " Donking" Sasuman – PBA Player
 Harold Sta. Cruz – URBL, MVBA, Liga Pilipinas, ABL Player, Indonesia Warriors (Import) 
 Eric Rodriguez – PBL, PBA, ABL Player
 Yeng Guiao – (GS) Before entering LSGH, PBA Head Coach, PBL Commissioner, Commentator and Politician
 Archand Christian Bagsit – Philippine Athlete Track & Field Gold Medalist in SEA Games
 Arnold Baradi - Silver Medalist, 1985 World Games, Taekwondo, Men's fin weight, and the first Filipino Gold medal winner in the Asian Taekwondo Games.
 Tonichi Pujante – Founding Commissioner of Vietnam Basketball Association (VBA)
 Chris Calaguio – PABL, MBA, PBA Player
 Aaron Aban – PBA Player

Businessmen
 Don Enrique Zobel -Businessman & Philanthropist
 Francisco Ortigas – Lawywer, Businessman
 Luis Quiray Abiva (GS, 1954; HS, 1958; BSC 1963) – former president, Abiva Publishing House
 Jaime Bautista (BSC 1977) – President and CEO of Philippine Airlines
 Tony Chua (Coll, 1975) – Businessman, Team Manager of the Barako Bull Energy Boosters (PBA), Executive Vice President, Philippines Football Federation (PFF)
 Henry Co – President and CEO, Ford Motors Philippines
 Geronimo B. de los Reyes Jr. – entrepreneur, philanthropist, and art collector
 Panfilo Domingo – (MBA-SMP, 2007) – Chairman/CEO University of the East/Allied Bank
 Francisco Cuervo Eizmendi (HS, 1952) – former president, San Miguel Corporation
 Ralph Lim Joseph (GS, 1965) – Owner, Ralph's Wines and Spirit
 Robert Lim Joseph (GS, 1963; HS, 1967) – Chairman, Travel Cooperative of the Philippines
 Henry Lim Bon Liong – Chairman and CEO of Sterling Paper Group of Companies; Dr. José Rizal Awardee for excellence in the field of Management and Finance 
 Aurelio Periquet, Jr. Business Leadership Awardee.
 James Gaviola Velasquez (HS, 1983) – Former President and Country General Manager, IBM Philippines. President & CEO of PT&T.
 Cesar Zalamea (B.A. in Accounting and Banking). Former President of the Philippine American Life Insurance Company (Philamlife). Former President & CEO of AIG Investment (Asia). Former Chairman & CEO of the Development Bank of the Philippines. Currently advisory director of Campbell Lutyens.
 Justo A. Ortiz + (HS) – Chief Executive Officer, Union Bank of the Philippines

Media Personalities
 Ariel Villasanta – (Business Management) TV host/Actor/Comedian The Misadventures of Maverick and Ariel, Totoo TV, Iskul Bukol as Perfecto "Pekto" Pangkista, Creative Director of PLDT
 Johnny Delgado (HS, 1965) – Actor
 Maryo J. de los Reyes (PR, 1962) – TV and Movie Director
 Ted Failon – News Anchor and Host of ABS-CBN
 Eddie Gutierrez (Commerce) – Actor and former matinee idol
 Juancho Gutierrez – Actor, one of the 1950s most popular leading men in Philippine cinema.
 German Moreno – (deceased) Television host, actor, comedian and talent manager (star-builder).
 Vic Sotto (PR, 1964; GS, 1967, HS; 1971) – Actor/Host
 Raymond Lauchengco - Actor and singer
 Ramon Tulfo (GS, 1960) – TV Host, Radio Broadcaster, Columnist
 Carlo Guevara – one of the Host of Party Pilipinas GMA7, winner of Be Bench
 Lourd de Veyra – (HS) vocalist of the band Radioactive Sago Project, host of TV5's Wasak and History with Lourd
 Wendell Ramos (HS) – Veteran Actor, Host, Comedian, & Matinee Idol. 
Others
 Tobias Enverga (BA-Economics) – The first Filipino-Canadian appointed in the Senate of Canada.
 Jose Maria Sison (HS '56) – Founding Chairman, Communist Party of the Philippines; Current Chairman, International League of Peoples' Struggle, Literary critic, Marxist theoretician, Award-winning Poet
 Antonio M. Molina – composer, conductor, pedagogue, historian, and music administrator, Premio Zobel awardee (1985)

Sources
For the Alumni list:

https://web.archive.org/web/20091018232147/http://geocities.com/sinupan/pinoy.htm
https://web.archive.org/web/20071018192233/http://letranalumni.org/awards_awardees.asp
https://web.archive.org/web/20071120130909/http://philippinefolio.com/contdetail.php?id=25&id_app2=353&id_app3=01674
http://www.letran.edu/about/letranites.php
http://www.letran.edu/about/presidents.php
https://web.archive.org/web/20070224043336/http://elibrary.supremecourt.gov.ph/index4.php

References

External links

Official website of Colegio de San Juan de Letran- Intramuros, Manila
Official website of Colegio de San Juan de Letran- Calamba, Laguna
Official website of Colegio de San Juan de Letran- Abucay, Bataan
Official website of Letran Alumni Association, Inc. (Ex-Alumnos de Letran)

Colegio de San Juan de Letran
Catholic universities and colleges in Manila
Educational institutions established in the 1620s
1620 establishments in the Philippines
Education in Intramuros
Education in Calamba, Laguna
Universities and colleges in Laguna (province)
Universities and colleges in Manila
Universities and colleges in Bataan
Universities and colleges in Pangasinan
National Collegiate Athletic Association (Philippines) colleges
Dominican educational institutions in the Philippines
Spanish colonial infrastructure in the Philippines